Thomas Vaughan (by 1479 – 1543), of Dover, Kent, was an English politician.

Vaughan was a Member of Parliament (MP) for the constituency of Dover in 1523 and 1539.

References

15th-century births
1543 deaths
Members of the Parliament of England for Dover
English MPs 1523
English MPs 1539–1540